Adrianus Egbert Willem "Adriaan" "Arie" de Jong (21 June 1882 – 23 December 1966) was a fencer who competed at five Olympic Games.

However, he had his greatest international success with the sabre, where he won the first two World Championships in 1922 and 1923.

With the épée, he won bronze at the 1912 Olympics and silver at the 1922 world championships.

During the individual sabre event at the 1924 Olympics, he reached the semi-finals against Hungarian Sándor Pósta and was leading by three hits when an audience member fell through his chair. This distracted the jury, who failed to see De Jong's decisive hit. Disrupted, De Jong lost the bout. De Jong eventually finished fifth (one ahead of eventual seven-time Danish Olympian Ivan Joseph Martin Osiier) while Pósta went on to win gold.

See also
 List of athletes with the most appearances at Olympic Games

References

External links
 

1882 births
1966 deaths
Dutch male sabre fencers
People from Kendal Regency
Sportspeople from Central Java
Olympic fencers of the Netherlands
Fencers at the 1906 Intercalated Games
Fencers at the 1908 Summer Olympics
Fencers at the 1912 Summer Olympics
Fencers at the 1920 Summer Olympics
Fencers at the 1924 Summer Olympics
Fencers at the 1928 Summer Olympics
Olympic bronze medalists for the Netherlands
Olympic medalists in fencing
Royal Netherlands Army officers
Medalists at the 1912 Summer Olympics
Medalists at the 1920 Summer Olympics
Medalists at the 1924 Summer Olympics
Dutch male épée fencers
Dutch male foil fencers
20th-century Dutch people